This is a list of compositions by José Vianna da Motta.

Piano

Piano Solo
Barcarola, Op. 1/1
Barcarola, Op. 1/2
Fantasiestücke, Op. 2
3 Scenas Portugezas, Op. 9/1: Cantiga d’Amor
3 Scenas Portugezas, Op. 9/2: Chula
3 Scenas Portugezas, Op. 9/3: Valsa Caprichosa
Vito, Op. 11
Adeus, minha terra, Op. 15/2
Ballada, Op. 16
Barcarola #2, Op. 17
3 Improvisos, Op. 18
Piano Sonata in D Major
Cenas portuguesas
‘Invocation of the Lusiads’ for piano solo
Romance
Two Romances
Dramatic Fantasy
Five Portuguese Rhapsodies
Waltz
Serenada
Capriccio
Meditação

Chamber music

Violin and Piano
Violin Sonata

Piano Trio
Piano Trio

String Quartet
String Quartet in C Minor
String Quartet
Andante for String Quartet
Variações for String Quartet
Cenas nas Montanhas for String Quartet

Other
Violin Sonata (with Piano four-hands)

Orchestral

Symphonies
Symphony ‘À Pátria’, Op. 13

Symphonic Poems
Dona Inês de Castro Overture
Die Lusiaden for Orchestra and Chorus

Piano and Orchestra
Piano Concerto in A Major
Fantasia Dramatica for Piano and Orchestra

Choral Music
Os Lusiadas’ for Piano and Choir
Ave Maria for Female choir and string orchestra

Lieder
Op. 3
Das Bächlein
Frühlingsregen (Ludwig August Frankl)
Sonntag (Joseph Freiherr von Eichendorff)
Op. 4
Wiegenlied (Wilhelm Raabe)
Op. 5
Gefunden (Johann Wolfgang von Goethe)
Entschluß (Ludwig Uhland)
Gute Nacht (Adele Schaeffer)
Tanzlied (Wilhelm Müller)
Hier an der Bergeshalde (Theodor Storm)
Op. 8
Im Volkston (Wilhelm Raabe)
Über den Wolken (Wilhelm Raabe)
Die Jungfrau im Walde (Wilhelm Raabe)
In der Dämmerung (Wilhelm Raabe)
Op. 10
Abschied (Peter Cornelius)
Guter Rat (Peter Cornelius)
Erfüllung (Peter Cornelius)
Ländlicher Reigen (Peter Cornelius)
Op. 13
Danke! (Peter Cornelius)
Umflort, Gehüllt in Trauern (Peter Cornelius)
Laß Mich Deine Augen Fragen (Peter Cornelius)
Op. 15
Johannistag (Wilhelm Raabe)
Das Lied von Falkensteiner (Wilhelm Raabe)
Eine Briefelein (Wilhelm Raabe)
Monikas Traum (Wilhelm Raabe)
Die Spröde (Johann Wolfgang von Goethe)
Olhos Negros (Almeida Garrett)
A Estrela (Almeida Garrett)
Cancão Perdida (Guerra Junqueiro)
Lavadeira e Caçador (João de Deus)
A Luz (João de Deus)
Cantar dos Búzios (Afonso Lopes Vieira)
Verdes São as Hortas (Luís de Camões)

External links
List of compositions (in German)

Vianna Da Motta, Jose